The second season of La Voz Senior premiered in 27 April 2021, on Azteca Uno. Ricardo Montaner, Yahir, and Belinda returned as coaches from the previous season, meanwhile María José joined the coaching panel, replacing Lupillo Rivera. Eddy Vilard joined as the show's host.

Coaches 

Filmimg for the second season started in late 2020, revealing Ricardo Montaner, Belinda, María José and Yahir as the coaches. But, it wasn't until April 2021 when they were officially confirmed by the broadcaster. This marks Belinda's fifth, Montaner's fourth, and María's and Yahir's third season coaching in the Mexican versions of La Voz.

On 31 May 2021, Omar Alexander was announced as the winner, marking coach Ricardo's
fourth victory throughout the La Voz franchise. Also, this marked La Vox Mexico first back-to-back coach to win in seasons.

Teams 
 Color key

  Winner
  Runner-up
  Eliminated in the Finale
  Eliminated in the Semifinal
  Eliminated in the Knockouts

Blind Auditions 
In the Blind Auditions, each coach had to complete their teams with 12 contestants.

Episode 1 (April 27) 
The coaches performed "Bésame Mucho" at the beginning of the episode.

Episode 2 (May 3)

Episode 3 (May 4)

Episode 4 (May 10)

Episode 5 (May 11)

Knockouts 
The Knockouts round started on 17 May. In this round, three contestants of each team compete face to face in a knockout. The artist who is chosen by their coach as the winner advances to the Semifinal.

Final Phase

Week 1: Semifinal (May 25) 

In the Semifinal, the sixteen remaining participants performed in order to become one of their coach's choice to advance into the Finale. Each coach advanced with two artists, while the other two were eliminated.

Week 2: Finale (May 31) 
The Finale was prerecorded. In the first round, the participants sang a solo song. After the performances, each coach had to choose one artist to advance to the second round. In this round, the four finalists performed their song from the Blind auditions. The show's production shot four different winning results (one per finalist), but only the chosen winner by the public at home one was shown on TV.

First Round

Second Round

Elimination Chart

Color key 

Artist's info

Result details

Ratings

References 

Mexico